The 2005 World Junior Wrestling Championships were the 29th edition of the World Junior Wrestling Championships and were held in Vilnius, Lithuania between 4-10 July 2005.

Medal table

Medal summary

Men's freestyle

Greco-Roman

Women's freestyle

References

External links 
 UWW Database

World Junior Championships
Wrestling Championships
Wrestling in Lithuania
World Junior Wrestling Championships
Sports competitions in Vilnius